Stubbington is a village which is located between Southampton and Portsmouth, in the county of Hampshire on the south coast of England. It is within the borough of  Fareham.

History

Both Stubbington and neighbouring Crofton were mentioned in the Domesday Book (the 11th-century UK census) as small districts belonging to the estates of Titchfield Abbey.

The earliest known cricket match to have been played in Hampshire took place in the village in 1733.

During the 19th century, Stubbington engulfed Crofton and the small fishing village of Hill Head. The Crofton name still remains in the name of many local facilities, such as the Crofton School and Crofton Old Church.

At the start of the 20th century, the village still consisted of just a few dozen cottages and farms. By 1939, the population had risen to around 2,500, and a number of small shops had opened surrounding the village green. This remains the focus of the village to the present day, with a war memorial situated on the central village green.

The Church

The 'Crofton Old Church' at Crofton is one of the oldest known inhabited sites in the area. It was mentioned in the Domesday Book in 1086, and it is thought to date back to the reign of King Alfred the Great in the 9th century. It is believed to have caught the eye of Samuel Pepys in 1662, and was extensively renovated during the 13th century. A new church (Holy Rood) was built in Stubbington which took over the function of Crofton Church in 1878.

The War Memorial and Village Pump

In 1922 a wooden War Memorial was built to commemorate those from Stubbington and Hill Head who fell in the First World War. Their names were carved into the roof of the memorial although over the years they have been worn away. The Memorial takes the form of a shelter over the village pump, and today it is one of few pre-war structures standing in the vicinity of Stubbington Village Centre. The names carved into the roof of the memorial have now been cleaned and can be seen clearly.

Present day
The population of Stubbington has risen to over 25,000, with new housing estates taking over a number of the surrounding fields. The town has a number of modern shops as well as a range of other facilities, including a doctor, dentist, library, community centre and seven schools. The former Royal Navy site of HMS Daedalus lies between Stubbington and neighbouring Lee-on-the-Solent, and a small part is currently being developed, however more is scheduled for further development that could further expand the town.

Neighbouring areas
The nearest village is Titchfield.  Also near Stubbington is the area of Fareham called Hill Head and the town of Lee-on-the-Solent.

Schools 
Crofton School (Secondary Comprehensive)
Crofton Anne Dale Infant School
Crofton Anne Dale Junior School
Crofton Hammond Infant School
Crofton Hammond Junior School

See also
Crofton School
List of places of worship in the Borough of Fareham
Stubbington House School

Notes

References

External links

Villages in Hampshire
Borough of Fareham